Changliu is a town (a township-level division) in Xiuying District of Haikou City, Hainan, China.

Changliu is located in the far western suburbs of Haikou.

See also
List of township-level divisions of Hainan

References

Township-level divisions of Hainan
Haikou